Townend is a 17th-century house located in Troutbeck, in the civil parish of Lakes, near Windermere, Cumbria, England, and in the ownership of the National Trust. It was donated to the Trust in 1948. Prior to this it was the home of the Browne family, local farmers, for 400 years. Although not the sort of stately home usually associated with the National Trust, it provides an insight into the life of a reasonably wealthy farming family. It is a grade I listed building.

References

External links
 Papers of several generations of the Browne family of Townend, Troutbeck, at Cumbria Archive Centre, Kendal

Country houses in Cumbria
National Trust properties in the Lake District
Historic house museums in Cumbria
Grade I listed houses in Cumbria
South Lakeland District